Habronattus fallax is a species of spiders from the family Salticidae found in the United States and Mexico.

Description
The species are brownish-black, and have a size of 1/8 of an inch. The females have markings, which includes a stripe, on their lower abdomen, while the males have two spots instead, with white stripes that are located on the front of the cephalothorax.

Ecology
The species feed on leaf beetles and other insects.

References

Salticidae
Spiders of Mexico
Spiders of the United States
Spiders described in 1909